Ted Sieger (born 18 May 1958 in Coquimbo, Chile) is a Swiss illustrator, director, writer and producer known for, among others, the animated television series Ted Sieger's Wildlife. In 2007, he was awarded the Special Mention of Jury at the 5th Festival of European Animated Feature Films and TV Specials alongside Michael Ekblad for their work on The Fourth King.

Filmography 
Schneckenmensch (1986)
Walddebatte (1990)
Jean-Claude des Alpes (1991)
Talk To Me (1991)
Sheep (1993)
Ted Sieger's Wildlife (TV series, 1999)
Fast ein Gebet (2002)
The Fourth King (2005)
The Little Monsterette (2005)
Ted Sieger's Molly Monster (TV series, 52 episodes, 2009)
Molly und das Weihnachtsmonster (2010)
The Smortlybacks (2013)
Ted Sieger's Molly Monster the Movie (2016)
The Smortlybacks Come Back! (2022)

References

External links

1958 births
Living people
People from Coquimbo
Swiss writers